Smeet is a browser-based virtual world video game developed in Berlin, Germany. Smeet is a browser based 3D social MMO. The game was developed by Smeet Communications GmbH.

History
In January 2011, Smeet reached around six million subscribers and was translated into about nine different languages.

Gameplay
Users can create and customize their profiles and avatars, earn “Fame Points”, and progress to higher levels. With increasing numbers of Fame Points and levels, users gain a higher social status and can receive additional content.

Players can choose from several themed quizzes and minigames or complete tasks and games, generating Fame Points through the leveling system. They can also buy pets, plants or fantasy creatures and feed and water them, causing them to grow over time.

Smeet was playable from any browser supporting flash.

Partnership and projects
Smeet has numerous partner projects with brands including RTL (Bertelsmann), Endemol, and Bravo.  Smeet also enables a social viewing feature via the integration of videos with user generated content. The videos are mainly streamed from video-sharing websites such as YouTube, but there have also been partnerships with national television channels.

References

See also 
 IMVU

External links 
 

2007 video games
Social casual games
Facebook games
Browser-based multiplayer online games
Virtual world communities
German social networking websites
Windows games
Macintosh games
Companies based in Berlin